Stepney is an English surname. Notable people with the surname include:

Alban Stepney (died 1611), English politician 
Alex Stepney (born 1942), English footballer
Arthur Cowell-Stepney (1834–1909), British landowner and politician
Catherine Stepney (1778–1845), English novelist
Charles Stepney (1931–1976), American record producer and musician
George Stepney (1663–1707), English poet and diplomat
John Stepney (disambiguation), multiple people
Michael Stepney (born 1980), Scottish bowler
Nigel Stepney (1958–2014), British Formula One mechanic

English-language surnames